General chemistry (sometimes referred to as "gen chem") is offered by colleges and universities as an introductory level chemistry course usually taken by students during their first year. The course is usually run with a concurrent lab section that gives students an opportunity to experience a laboratory environment and carry out experiments with the material learned in the course. These labs can consist of acid-base titrations, kinetics, equilibrium reactions, and electrochemical reactions. Chemistry majors as well as students across STEM majors such as biology, biochemistry, biomedicine, physics, and engineering are usually required to complete one year of general chemistry as well.

Concepts taught 
The concepts taught in a typical general chemistry course are as follows:
Stoichiometry
Conservation of energy
Conservation of mass
Elementary atomic theory
Periodic table and periodicity
Law of constant composition
Gas laws
Nuclear chemistry
Solubility
Acid-base chemistry
Chemical bonding
Chemical kinetics
Thermodynamics
Electrochemistry
Chemical equilibria

Pre-medical track 
Students in colleges and universities looking to follow the "pre-medical" track are required to pass general chemistry as the Association of American Medical Colleges requires at least one full year of chemistry.  In order for students to apply to medical school, they must pass the medical college admission test, or MCAT, which consists of a section covering the foundations of general chemistry. General chemistry covers many of the principal foundations that apply to medicine and the human body that is essential in our current understanding and practice of medicine.

Topics of general chemistry covered by the AAMC Medical College Admissions Test 

 Acids and bases
 Atomic structure
 Bonding and chemical interactions
 Chemical kinetics
 Electrochemistry
 Equilibrium
 Solutions
 Stoichiometry
 The gas phase
 Thermochemistry
 Redox reactions

"Weed out course" 
Students who are enrolled in general chemistry often desire to become doctors, researchers, and educators. Because of the demands of these fields, professors believe that the level of rigor that is associated with general chemistry should be elevated from that of a typical introductory course. This has led to this course to gain the title of a "weed out course" where students drop out from their respected major due to the level of difficulty. Students can have different perceptions of the course based on their experiences, or lack thereof, in high school chemistry courses. Students who enroll in AP chemistry in high school, a course that mirrors what is covered in college, could be perceived as having an advantage over students who do not come to college with a strong chemistry background. Students who wish to be competitive in applying to medical schools try to achieve success in general chemistry as the average GPA for medical school matriculants was 3.71 in 2017. This makes a simply passing grade not acceptable for students with medical school aspirations. General chemistry professors have been known to make tests worth a large portion of the course, and make them more challenging than the material presents itself as. Grade deflation, purposely adjusting the grades of a course to be lower, is also an issue of general chemistry courses at the undergraduate level.

References

External links

 
Chemistry education

zh-yue:普通化學